Dundas Castle, ( and 1915–1924)  and also called Craig–E–Clair, is located in Roscoe, Sullivan County, New York and was designed for Ralph Wurts-Dundas. An earlier structure, Beaverkill Lodge that was designed by Bradford Gilbert was built around 1891, was incorporated into the Castle.

Early History 
On this property, Gilbert constructed his summer retreat, Beaverkill Lodge. Gilbert's new wife, Maria, was Irish said "the Catskill scenery reminded her of home." She named the surrounding hamlet Craig–e–Clair which translates as "beautiful mountainside."

Wurts-Dundas Era 
In 1903, the Gilberts sold the property to Morris Stembach. Four years later, Stembach sold it to Ralph Wurts-Dundas in 1907. Wurts-Dundas was a wealthy and prominent New Yorker and grandson of William Wurts, one of three brothers who built the Delaware & Hudson Canal. He eventually shortened his name to Dundas.

Dundas wanted to expand the existing Beaverkill Lodge into the finest mansion his money could buy. Construction photographs show Beaverkill Lodge being "encapsulated within the castle structure." For his European-style castle, Dundas imported slate roofing from England, iron gates France, and marble from Italy for floors, fireplaces, and staircases. The only local product used was stone from the nearby Beaverkill River. The reception room's fireplace was covered in gold leaf and valued at more than $5,000 in 1910.

Designed in the Gothic Revival and Elizabethan Revival styles, the 36-room residence was constructed between 1915 and 1924, but never completed or occupied by Dundas or his wife Josephine because he died in 1921. The castle was inherited by their daughter Muriel, along with some $40 million, but she did not go back to the Catskills and the castle.

Masons and Camp Eureka 
In 1949, Muriel sold the property for $47,000 to the Prince Hall Grand Lodge of the Masonic Order. This was a Manhattan-based organization of African American Masons who wanted to create "a Masonic home for the aged and indigent." Unfortunately, that project did not happen, so Mason's developed the property into a vacation retreat, using a barn as a recreation center, an old farmhouse for administration, and the castle for a fishing and hunting resort. Over time, they added new structures and turned the property into a summer camp for inner-city youth. Named Camp Eureka, this is the main activity of the site today.

Conservation 
The building and property were added to the National Register of Historic Places in 2001. In 2005, the Mason entered into a conservation easement with Open Space Conservancy, The easement limits future development on the property and protects its historic structures.

References

External links
 Dundas Castle: Aerial photos and history of the Dundas Castle at Abandoned
 Dundas Castle: History of the Dundas Castle by Rebecca Parsons
 Dundas Castle: History of the Dundas Castle from Friends of the Beaverkill Community
 The Lonely Castle: Photo essay and history of the Dundas Castle at The Photo Explorer
 The Lonely Castle Revisited: More photos of the Dundas Castle at The Photo Explorer
 The Mason's Castle - Photo essay and history of the Dundas Castle at The Art of Abandonment

Houses on the National Register of Historic Places in New York (state)
Houses completed in 1924
Houses in Sullivan County, New York
Historic districts on the National Register of Historic Places in New York (state)
National Register of Historic Places in Sullivan County, New York